The Grammy Award for Best Boxed or Special Limited Edition Package has been presented since 1995 to an album's art directors. The award is not bestowed upon or shared by the artist unless they are also a credited art director.

The award year reflects the year of presentation, not the year the work was actually released. The award category has previously been known as Best Recording Package – Boxed (1995–1997) and Best Boxed Recording Package (1998–2002). Usually, five nominees are presented, through in 2016, the number of nominees was six.

Years reflect the year in which the Grammy Awards were presented, for works released in the previous year.

Recipients

References

Boxed Or Special Limited Edition Package